Šterusy is a village and municipality in Piešťany District in the Trnava Region of western Slovakia.

History
In historical records the village was first mentioned in 1262.

Geography
The municipality lies at an altitude of 210 metres and covers an area of 11.080 km². It has a population of about 515 people.

References

External links

  Official page
http://www.statistics.sk/mosmis/eng/run.html

Villages and municipalities in Piešťany District